The Kid Bits collection is a composed of three mini-album/compilation cassettes released by Sharon, Lois & Bram in 1995 under the American Drive Entertainment Inc. label. They are available only on cassette and are some of the harder-to-find 'Sharon, Lois & Bram' cassettes. Each cassette features between thirteen and fourteen Sharon, Lois & Bram songs that were previously released on some of the trio's past albums.

Packaging
The cassettes, much like the Sharon, Lois & Bram Sampler cassette, features the same picture as the Sampler cassette, which was from the trio's Sing Around the Campfire album photo shoot. The only difference is the title and volume number listed on each cassette. Volume 1 being pink, Volume 2 being blue and Volume 3 being green. There is no inside flap or album information listed in any of the cassettes packaging.

Track listing

VOLUME 1:
"Turkey in the Straw"
"The Name Game"
"Five Little Monkeys"
"Everybody Happy"
"Jump Josie/Skip to My Loo"
"The Hokey Pokey"
"Two Little Blackbirds"
"Going to the Zoo"
"Peanut Butter & Jelly"
"The Farmer In the Dell"
"Ten in the Bed"
"Little Sir Echo"
"Ticka Tacka Telephone"
"Cheerio"

VOLUME 2:

"Skinnamarink"
"Little Rabbit Foo-Foo"
"Tingalayo"
"The Smile on the Crocodile"
"Five Brown Buns"
"Do Your Ears Hang Low?"
"Mairzy Doats"
"Oh Dear, What Can the Matter Be?"
"Boomps-A-Daisy"
"I'm Not Small"
"Way Down Yonder in the Schoolyard"
"Old King Cole"
"Newfoundland Jig Medley"

VOLUME 3:

"She'll Be Comin' Round the Mountain"
"Hey Dum Diddeley Dum"
"Train Is A-Comin'"
"Ha-Ha, This-A-Way"
"The Muffin Man"
"Mommy, What If..."
"Noah's Old Ark"
"Little Liza Jane"
"Sarah the Whale"
"Jenny Jenkins"
"Down in the Valley, Two by Two"
"Pufferbellies"
"Fish & Chips & Vinegar"
"Terrence McDiddler/Three Little Fishies/'Ishin'"

All the songs found on these three mini-compilations can be found on Sharon, Lois & Bram's previous full-length albums, some of which include: "One Elephant, Deux Éléphants", "Sing A to Z", "Mainly Mother Goose", and "Singing 'n' Swinging".

Sharon, Lois & Bram albums
1995 compilation albums